Expeditie Robinson 2010 was the twelfth season of the RTL5 and 2BE reality television series Expeditie Robinson first aired on September 2, 2010. It was the second season hosted by Evi Hanssen and Eddy Zoëy.

This season included celebrities only.

Survivors

 Kamp Noord
 Kamp Zuid
 Geheim Kamp
 Langun
 Gaya

Future Appearances
Saar Koningsberger returned to compete in Expeditie Robinson 2021. Sebastiaan Labrie returned to compete in Expeditie Robinson: All Stars.

References

External links
 Official website Expeditie Robinson at RTL5
 Official website Expeditie Robinson at 2BE
 Blog Expeditie Robinson (Dutch)
 

Dutch reality television series
Expeditie Robinson seasons
2010 Dutch television seasons
2010 Belgian television seasons
2011 Belgian television seasons
2011 Dutch television seasons
Belgian reality television series